Šariš Museum in Bardejov - museum of Šariš region in Bardejov, Slovakia

The museum was founded in 1903 as The Museum of Šariš County (sl. Župa). Its first exposition and object purchases were focused on natural history. In 1907 a new historical exposition was opened in the interior of the City Hall and it was composed from the objects donated by church institutions and organizations. The Šariš Museum safely survived the First and Second World War. Nowadays it is known because of its natural history and historical exposition, but also because of its ethnographic open-air exposition (Museum of Folk Architecture, Ethnographic Open-Air Collection, Bardejov Spa in Bardejovske Kupele) and Carpathian Icons Gallery, one of the largest of its kind in Europe. It is one of the biggest museums in Slovakia with its collection of 700 000 objects.

Gallery

External links 
 http://www.muzeumbardejov.sk/english/english.htm

References 

Museums in Prešov Region
History museums in Slovakia
Art museums and galleries in Slovakia
Natural history museums in Slovakia
Museums established in 1903
1903 establishments in Slovakia
Bardejov